Macdowall or MacDowall may refer to:
McDowall (surname), includes Macdowall and MacDowall
Clan Macdowall, a lowlands Scottish clan
MacDowall, Saskatchewan, Organized Hamlet in Duck Lake No. 463 Saskatchewan, Canada